Bill Swain (born February 22, 1941) is a former American football linebacker who played in the National Football League for the Los Angeles Rams, Minnesota Vikings, New York Giants and Detroit Lions between 1963 and 1969.

External links
http://www.nfl.com/players/billswain/profile?id=SWA166116

1941 births
Living people
American football linebackers
Los Angeles Rams players
Minnesota Vikings players
New York Giants players
Detroit Lions players
Oregon Ducks football players
People from Dickinson, North Dakota
Clark College alumni